

Available titles
The following is the complete list of the 33 Virtual Console titles available for the Nintendo 3DS in South Korea sorted by system and release date.

Game Boy
There are 13 games available to purchase.

Game Boy Color
There are 7 games available to purchase.

Nintendo Entertainment System
There are 15 games available to purchase.

See also
 List of Virtual Console games for Wii (South Korea)

Notes

References

Video game lists by platform
Nintendo-related lists

ko:대한민국의 버추얼 콘솔 목록